Peruvians in Chile (Spanish: Peruanos en Chile) consists of mainly of immigrants and expatriates from Peru as well as their locally born descendants. Both countries share the Spanish language; their historical origins are common (part of the Spanish Empire).

Notable people
 Tomás Enrique Araya Díaz, Chilean-American musician of Basque, Spanish, Peruvian descent.
 José Balbuena Rodríguez, Peruvian-born Chilean soccer player (born in Lima).
 Felipe Humberto Camiroaga Fernández, Television presenter, actor, comedian of Basque, German and Peruvian descent.
 Pablo Ignacio Cárdenas Baeza, Soccer player, Peruvian father
 Segundo Castillo Varela, Peruvian-born Chilean soccer player (born in Callao, Peru)
 Javier García Choque, Chilean politician, Peruvian great-grandfather
 Joao Luis Ortiz Pérez, Chilean-Peruvian soccer player, Peruvian father

See also

Chile-Peru relations

References

Chile
Peruvian